Potassium hexafluoronickelate(IV) is an inorganic compound with the chemical formula .  It can be produced through the reaction of potassium fluoride, nickel dichloride, and fluorine.

It reacts violently with water, releasing oxygen.  It dissolves in anhydrous hydrogen fluoride to produce a light-red solution.  Potassium hexafluoronickelate(IV) decomposes at 350 °C, forming potassium hexafluoronickelate(III), nickel(II) fluoride, and fluorine:

Potassium hexafluoronickelate is a strong oxidant.

( X = Cl or Br , -60 °C , aHF = anhydrous hydrogen fluoride).

Potassium hexafluoronickelate decomposes at high temperatures to release fluorine gas; like terbium(IV) fluoride, the emitted fluorine is primarily monatomic rather than the typical diatomic.

It adopts the structure seen for K2PtCl6 and Mg2FeH6.

References 

Potassium compounds
Nickel complexes
Fluoro complexes